Hunterdon Developmental Center (HDC) is a developmental center located on 102 acres in Union Township, Hunterdon County, New Jersey, near Clinton.  It opened in 1969 and provides a broad spectrum of behavioral, medical and habilitation services to women and men with intellectual and developmental disabilities. HDC also operates a Work Activity Center (WAC). As of March 2017, HDC had a census of 480 residents.

The center is for adults with neurodevelopmental disorders complicated by cognitive dysfunction.  It is a 650-bed residential facility.  Established diagnoses include Down syndrome, Fragile X syndrome, Trisomy 8 mosaic syndrome, Trisomy 13 syndrome, Williams syndrome, Angelman syndrome, Smith–Magenis syndrome, PKU, Tuberous sclerosis, Neurofibromatosis, Sturge–Weber syndrome, Congenital rubella syndrome, the syndrome of hypoxic/ischemic perinatal brain injury, lead encephalopathy, hydrocephalus, prosencephaly, schizencephaly, and other diagnoses.

It was originally the Hunterdon State School and started in 1966.

References

External links

University of Medicine & Dentistry of New Jersey "Hunterdon Developmental Center"

Buildings and structures in Hunterdon County, New Jersey
1966 establishments in New Jersey